Dunama claricentrata is a moth in the  family Notodontidae. It is found in French Guiana.

References

Moths described in 1916
Notodontidae of South America